MAAF is a four-letter acronym that may stand for:

 Malayan Auxiliary Air Force, original precursor of the Royal Malaysian Air Force
 Mediterranean Allied Air Forces, was the major Allied air force command organization in the Mediterranean theater from mid-December 1943 until the end of the Second World War.
 Michael Army Airfield at Dugway Proving Ground, abbreviated as Michael AAF or MAAF
 Military Association of Atheists & Freethinkers
 magical African-American friend, a stock character in fiction
 Mutuelle d'assurance des artisans de France, a French insurance company